Paxillus filamentosus, commonly known as the alder roll-rim, is a basidiomycete fungus which is associated with alder (Alnus) in northern Europe and southwestern Greenland, and North America. It closely resembles Paxillus involutus, but its fruit bodies are generally smaller.

Some sources regard Paxillus rubicundulus as a synonym, but MycoBank and Index Fungorum treat it as different species.

References

External links

Paxillaceae
Fungi described in 1772
Fungi of Europe
Fungi of North America